James Claude Wright Jr. (December 22, 1922 – May 6, 2015) was an American politician who served as the 48th speaker of the United States House of Representatives from 1987 to 1989. He represented Texas's 12th congressional district as a Democrat from 1955 to 1989.

Born in Fort Worth, Texas, Wright won election to the Texas House of Representatives after serving in the United States Army Air Forces during World War II. He won election to Congress in 1954, representing a district that included his home town of Fort Worth. Like most Texas Democrats, Wright distinguished himself from many of his fellow Southern congressmen in his refusal to sign the 1956 Southern Manifesto. He voted for the Voting Rights Act of 1965 and the Civil Rights Acts of 1960 and 1968, although he voted against the Civil Rights Acts of 1957 and 1964 and the 24th Amendment to the U.S. Constitution. He also became a senior member of the House Public Works Committee.

In 1976, Wright narrowly won election to the position of House Majority Leader. Wright voted in favor of the bill establishing Martin Luther King Jr. Day as a federal holiday in August 1983. He became Speaker of the House after Tip O'Neill retired in 1987. In March 1988, Wright led the House Democratic Caucus as Speaker to override President Reagan's veto of the Civil Rights Restoration Act of 1987. Wright resigned from Congress in June 1989 amid a House Ethics Committee investigation into compensation that he and his wife had received. After leaving Congress, Wright became a professor at Texas Christian University. He died in Fort Worth in 2015.

Early life
Wright was born in Fort Worth, the son of Marie (Lyster) and James Claude Wright. Wright was of English and Irish ancestry. Because his father was a traveling salesman, Wright and his two sisters were reared in numerous communities in Texas and Oklahoma. He mostly attended Fort Worth and Dallas public schools, eventually graduating from Adamson High School (formerly Oak Cliff High School). He studied at Weatherford College and the University of Texas at Austin, but did not graduate.

In December 1941, Wright enlisted in the United States Army Air Forces, and after training, he was commissioned as a second lieutenant in the Air Corps in 1942. He trained as a bombardier and earned a Distinguished Flying Cross flying during combat in B-24 Liberators with the 530th Bomb Squadron, 380th Bomb Group (Heavy) in the South Pacific during World War II. His retelling of his wartime exploits is contained in his 2005 book The Flying Circus: Pacific War—1943—As Seen through A Bombsight.

After the war, he made his home in Weatherford, where he joined partners in forming a Trade Show exhibition and marketing firm. As a Democrat, he won his first election without opposition in 1946 to the Texas House of Representatives, where he served from 1947 to 1949. He was defeated in his bid for reelection in 1948, after a rival claimed that Wright was weak in opposing both communism and interracial marriage. He was the mayor of Weatherford from 1950 to 1954. In 1953, he served as president of the League of Texas Municipalities.

Career in Congress
In 1954, he was elected to Congress from Texas's 12th congressional district, which included Fort Worth and Weatherford. He won despite the fervid opposition off Fort Worth Star-Telegram publisher Amon G. Carter, who supported incumbent Democrat Wingate Lucas. Wright would be re-elected fourteen times, gradually rising in prominence in the party and in Congress. He developed a close relationship with Amon G. Carter Jr., and often repeated the axiom that the easiest way to "defeat an enemy is to make him your friend."

In 1956, Wright refused to join most of his regional colleagues in signing the segregationist Southern Manifesto, and voted in favor of the Civil Rights Acts of 1960 and 1968, and the Voting Rights Act of 1965. However, he voted against the Civil Rights Act of 1957 signed by U.S. President Dwight Eisenhower, and Wright refused to support the Civil Rights Act of 1964, which required desegregation of public accommodations and established the Equal Employment Opportunity Commission. His reason for not supporting that legislation had to do with the voting rights provision of the law, which Wright enthusiastically supported, and felt the Civil Rights Act was weak without the right to vote granted to all citizens. It was signed into law by Wright's friend, President Johnson. Wright also voted against the 24th Amendment to the U.S. Constitution. Wright would later vote in favor of the bill establishing Martin Luther King Jr. Day as a federal holiday in August 1983 as well as lead the House Democratic Caucus as Speaker in March 1988 to override President Reagan's veto of the Civil Rights Restoration Act of 1987.

In 1961, Wright finished in third place in the special election called to fill the U.S. Senate seat vacated by then Vice President Lyndon Johnson. Two finalists for the Senate emerged from a field of seventy-one candidates. College professor John G. Tower, then of Wichita Falls, narrowly defeated the interim appointee William Blakley, a Dallas industrialist, in a runoff election. Tower became the first Republican senator from Texas since Reconstruction. Wright was riding in the motorcade in Dallas on November 22, 1963, when President John F. Kennedy was assassinated.

Wright continued to serve in the House and became a senior member of the Public Works Committee.  Though in line to become committee chairman, he entered the race for House Majority Leader and was elected by one vote in December 1976, defeating Richard Bolling of Missouri and Phillip Burton of California. Wright won the majority leadership position with the support of all but two Democrats from the large Texas delegation, all Democrats on the Public Works Committee, and virtually all other Southern representatives.

In the Dallas/Fort Worth Metroplex, Jim Wright is infamous for the Wright Amendment, a contentious law he sponsored that restricted air travel from Dallas's secondary airport, Love Field. Passed in 1979, the Wright Amendment was originally designed to protect the then-fledgling Dallas/Fort Worth International Airport. The Amendment allows non-stop flights originating from or bound to any commercial airport within  of the DFW Airport Control Tower to serve only states bordering Texas. It was the compromise agreed to with Southwest Airlines to expand their territory beyond Texas.  This requires any flight going to or coming from a destination within that  radius (Dallas Love Field and the now-defunct Greater Southwest International Airport in Fort Worth were the only airports affected) to land in a contiguous (bordering) state before continuing on to its destination. This effectively limited traffic from Love Field and GSIA to small, regional airlines (and provided the springboard for the later success of Southwest Airlines, which initially flew only within Texas) who were largely unable to compete with DFW Airport as a result. While the Amendment was welcomed at first, there were increasing doubts about its necessity as DFW grew into one of the three largest airports in the world. Many saw it as a boondoggle to benefit one particular group. Others saw it as an unlawful restraint of trade imposed against the two affected airports, and no others, in spite of the fact that public officials of Dallas and Ft Worth had agreed to the restrictions (Virginia McGuire, daughter of James C. Wright, direct conversation). However, the largest opposition came increasingly from people who simply felt that the amendment had outlived its usefulness and was also an unwarranted intrusion on the free markets of the deregulated airline industry. In 2006 Congress passed the Wright Amendment Reform Act of 2006, which repealed the Wright Amendment in stages; the last restrictions on travel from Love Field were lifted on October 13, 2014. 

Wright strongly supported the Superconducting Super Collider project in Waxahachie in Ellis County, but the work was halted in 1993.

Speaker of the House
When the 100th Congress convened on January 6, 1987, Wright was elected Speaker of the House (254–173 over Republican Robert H. Michel), succeeding Tip O'Neill, who had retired after 10 years in the post. At the time, Wright stated that being speaker of the House "is the greatest responsibility that can come to a lawmaker anywhere in the world."

In July 1988, he chaired the Democratic Party convention that nominated Michael Dukakis for president. During that convention, Wright introduced John F. Kennedy Jr. for Kennedy's first televised speech. Almost 25 years earlier, on November 22, 1963, President John F. Kennedy, in his last speech before being assassinated, praised Wright's service in the Congress, saying "and here in Fort Worth he has contributed to its growth. He speaks for Fort Worth and he speaks for the country, and I don't know any city that is better represented in the Congress of the United States than Fort Worth."

While Dukakis lost the 1988 presidential election to Republican George H. W. Bush, Democrats retained control of the House in the coinciding congressional elections, thus when the 101st Congress opened on January 3, 1989, Wright was re-elected as speaker.  According to historian Julian E. Zelizer, the majority Democrats ran roughshod over the Republican (GOP) minority. They minimized the number of staff positions available to the minority, kept them out of decision-making, and gerrymandered their home districts. Firebrand Republican Newt Gingrich argued that American democracy was being ruined by the Democrats' tactics and that the GOP had to destroy the system before it could be saved. Cooperation in governance, says Zelizer, was put aside as they deposed Speaker Wright and regained power. Gingrich gained support from the media (always looking for scandal) and from good government forces in his crusade to persuade Americans that the system was, in Gingrich's words,  “morally, intellectually and spiritually corrupt.” Gingrich did force out Wright, but after he became Speaker Gingrich was himself forced out and scandal ruined the careers of other top GOP leaders.<ref>Julian E. Zelizer, "Burning Down the House: Newt Gingrich, the Fall of a Speaker, and the Rise of the New Republican Party (2020).</ref>

Aide controversy
In May 1989, controversy arose when media reports revealed that Wright's top assistant, John Mack, had violently attacked a woman 16 years earlier. The woman, Pamela Small, was hit repeatedly with a hammer, stabbed and slashed with a knife and left for dead. Small survived the attack, and reported it to the police. Mack was convicted of malicious wounding and was sentenced to 15 years in prison, but was paroled after serving 27 months. Mack, whose brother was married to Wright's daughter, was given a clerk's job in the Capitol upon his release. He went on to become the executive director of the Democratic Steering and Policy Committee and served as Wright's chief legislative strategist. Critics, including feminist activist Andrea Dworkin, alleged that Wright manipulated the legal system to get Mack off and, subsequently, protected him from media scrutiny. Amid the blistering public criticism, John Mack resigned from his post on May 11, and House members of both parties began to question whether Wright could long-remain as speaker.

Ethics investigation and resignation

In 1988 Wright became the target of an inquiry by the House Ethics Committee. Their report in early 1989 implied that he had used bulk purchases of his book, Reflections of a Public Man, to earn speaking fees in excess of the allowed maximum, and that his wife, Betty, was given a job and perks to avoid the limit on gifts. Faced with an increasing loss of effectiveness, Wright tendered his resignation as Speaker on May 31, 1989, the resignation to become effective on the selection of a successor. He was the first Speaker to resign because of a scandal. On June 6, the Democratic Caucus brought Wright's speakership to an end by selecting his replacement, Tom Foley of Washington, and on June 30 Wright resigned his seat in Congress.

The incident was controversial and was a part of the increasing partisan infighting that has plagued the Congress ever since. The original charges were filed by Newt Gingrich in 1988 and their effect propelled Gingrich's own career advancement to the Speaker's chair.

Michael Parenti, critic of the national security state, attributed Wright's forced resignation to the critical questions he was raising in the late 1980s with regard to CIA covert actions in Nicaragua.  Wright had not only criticized Reagan's policy, but taken the extremely unusual step of entering into negotiations with the Nicaraguan government as Speaker.

William K. Black claims that Wright's interventions in the Savings and Loan (S&L) crisis "were decisive in forcing him to resign in disgrace from the House".  Black wrote that Wright had been saved from financial ruin and elevated to Speaker of the House by massive campaign contributions from control frauds like Charles Keating.  The control frauds managed to get hundreds of executives of S&Ls, many legitimate, to talk with their representatives in the US congress to delay effective governmental action against the frauds.  This action only increased (a) the billions of dollars their ultimate failures cost the US taxpayers and (b) the magnitude of the resulting scandal. Wright's account of these facts was very different, citing both abuse of power by regulators, and money laundering by S&Ls in the profits diverted to Nicaragua in the Iran-Contra scandal. The scandal robbed Wright's Democratic party of the "sleaze factor" issue in the 1988 presidential election, thereby handing the election to the Republican George H. W. Bush, according to Black.  He resigned to avoid the official documentation of his role in this that would almost certainly have come from hearings by the United States House Committee on Ethics, as it did for the Keating Five.  Wright's personal and public account of why he resigned was very different from that cited by William Black, who claimed Wright abused his power and certainly had reason to protect his own position and decisions at the Federal Home Loan Bank.

The charges filed against Wright did not mention Nicaragua.  The Iran-Contra operations from 1984 through most of 1986 involved the secret governmental support of Contra military and paramilitary activities in Nicaragua, despite Congressional prohibition on the support.  The Reagan White House was very involved in the sale of U.S. arms to Iran in contravention of stated U.S. policy and in possible violation of arms-export controls. In late November 1986, Reagan Administration officials announced that some of the proceeds from the sale of U.S. arms to Iran had been diverted to the Contras. President Bush's pardon of Secretary Weinberger on December 24, 1992, pre-empted a trial in which defense counsel indicated that they intended to call Bush as a witness.

A report by special counsel implicated him in a number of influence peddling charges, such as Vernon Savings and Loan, and attempting to get William K. Black fired as the deputy director of the Federal Savings and Loan Insurance Corporation (FSLIC) under Gray.  However, the charges against him concluded that, "while the Congressman's dealings with representatives of the Federal Home Loan Bank Board may have been intemperate, the committee was not persuaded that there is reason to believe that he exercised undue influence in his dealings with that agency."

Life after Congress
After his resignation from the House, Wright retired to Fort Worth. He served as a professor at Texas Christian University there, teaching a course titled "Congress and the Presidents."  He also wrote several books after his retirement. He was an avid reader but was stricken with macular degeneration.

In 2004, Wright was inducted into the Texas Trail Hall of Fame in the Fort Worth Stockyards. His exhibit says "Fort Worth Loves Him!"

In November 2013, Wright was denied a voter ID card at a Texas Department of Public Safety office, as he hadn't brought the duly-required documentation with him on the day of his visit.  He told the Fort Worth Star Telegram that "Nobody was ugly to us, but they insisted that they wouldn't give me an ID."  Wright expressed concern that the Texas voter ID law will unfairly deny elderly voters like himself the ability to vote.  Wright indicated that he had worked out a solution with the Texas DPS that would allow him to cast a ballot in an upcoming election, but feared that other elderly people, especially those in retirement homes, would be unable to navigate the requirements.

Toward the end of his life, in May 2014, Wright expressed regret over resigning as Speaker of the House. He said it may have been a "gross misjudgment" at the time.

Death
Wright died at the age of 92 on May 6, 2015. He was survived by his wife Betty and four children. He had previously undergone surgery twice to treat cancer, though it is not clear if his death was cancer-related.

House Minority Leader Nancy Pelosi, D-CA, stated, "Speaker Wright was a person of deep courage, brilliant eloquence, and complete mastery of the legislative process. Speaker Wright's strong, decisive leadership built an indelible legacy of progress, not only in his beloved state of Texas, but around the world. Wright championed prosperity for every working family, and helped lead the way to peace to Central America." The Speaker of the House, John Boehner, R-OH, stated that, "Speaker Wright understood as well as anyone this institution's closeness to the people, calling the House 'the raw essence of the nation'." President Barack Obama stated, "As a representative from Texas and Speaker of the House, Jim was passionate about investing in infrastructure, and he worked tirelessly to promote peace in Central America. Today, our thoughts and prayers are with Jim's family and friends, and the people he represented in Congress for so many years."

See also
 List of federal political scandals in the United States

References

Notes

Further reading
Barry, John. The Ambition and the Power: The Fall of Jim Wright: A True Story of Washington. New York: Viking Press, 1989. . (Paperback: Penguin, 1992. )Wright, Jim. Balance of Power: Presidents and Congress from the Era of McCarthy to the Age of Gingrich. Turner Publications, 1996. .
Wright, Jim. Reflections of a Public Man. Fort Worth, Texas: Madison Publishing Company, 1984.
Wright, Jim. The Flying Circus: Pacific War—1943—As Seen Through A Bombsight. Guilford, Connecticut: The Lyons Press, 2005. .
Wright, Jim. The Coming Water Famine.  New York: Coward-McCann, 1966.
 Zelizer, Julian E. "Burning Down the House: Newt Gingrich, the Fall of a Speaker, and the Rise of the New Republican Party (Penguin, 2020).

External links

Photos from the Jim Wright Collection at the Portal to Texas History

|-

|-

|-

|-

1922 births
2015 deaths
Speakers of the United States House of Representatives
Majority leaders of the United States House of Representatives
Democratic Party members of the United States House of Representatives from Texas
Democratic Party members of the Texas House of Representatives
Mayors of places in Texas
20th-century American politicians
United States Army Air Forces officers
United States Army Air Forces personnel of World War II
Recipients of the Distinguished Flying Cross (United States)
Texas Christian University faculty
University of Texas at Austin alumni
Weatherford College alumni
Writers from Texas
American people of English descent
American people of Irish descent
American United Methodists
Politicians from Dallas
Politicians from Fort Worth, Texas
People from Weatherford, Texas
20th-century Methodists